The Waikato International is an open international badminton tournament in New Zealand. This tournament is held in Waikato. This tournament is classified as BWF International Series tournament since Badminton World Federation (BWF) introduced in 1998, but it was downgraded to Future Series in 2015. Then, the event was promoted to a higher level of BWF International Series since 2017. Another tournament with higher level and prize money named New Zealand Open.

Previous results

Performances by nation

See also 
 New Zealand Open
 Auckland International
 North Harbour International

References 

Badminton tournaments in New Zealand
Recurring sporting events established in 1998